The International Republican Institute (IRI) is an American nonprofit organization. Most of its board is drawn from the Republican Party. It is committed to advancing freedom and democracy worldwide by helping political parties to become more issue-based and responsive, assisting citizens to participate in government planning, and working to increase the role of marginalized groups in the political process, including women and youth.

Founded in 1983, it was initially known as the National Republican Institute for International Affairs.

Its activities include assisting political parties and candidates develop their values and institutional structures, good governance practices, civil society development, civic education, women's and youth leadership development, electoral reform and election monitoring, and political expression in closed societies. IRI has been active in Haiti, Honduras, the Middle East, Poland, and Georgia. 

In 2018, US Senator John McCain informed its board of his intention to step down as chair of IRI after 25 years in the role and recommended for US Senator Dan Sullivan to succeed him.

Background
The IRI is an organization founded in 1983 after U.S. President Ronald Reagan's 1982 speech before the British Parliament in Westminster in which he proposed a broad objective of helping countries build the infrastructure of democracy. Quoting the UN Universal Declaration of Human Rights, he stated: "we must be staunch in our conviction that freedom is not the sole prerogative of a lucky few but the inalienable and universal right of all human beings."

The IRI operates abroad, providing training and assistance to political parties. As a 501(c)(3) tax-exempt organization, it plays no part in domestic U.S. politics. However, the majority of its board are drawn from the Republican Party. Its sister organization, the National Democratic Institute for International Affairs, draws mainly from the Democratic Party.

In 1995, IRI established the Freedom Award "to honor individuals who have worked to advance freedom and democracy in their countries and around the world".

Activities

Africa
IRI in Africa currently works in the following countries: Benin, Burkina Faso, Cameroon, Central African Republic, Chad, Democratic Republic of the Congo, Ethiopia, Ghana, Kenya, Mozambique, Nigeria, Sierra Leone, Somalia, Sudan, Tanzania, The Gambia, Uganda, and Zimbabwe.

Asia-Pacific
IRI in the Asia-Pacific currently works in the following countries Bangladesh, Burma, Cambodia, China, Fiji, Indonesia, Korea, Laos, Malaysia, Maldives, Mongolia, Nepal, Pakistan, Papua New Guinea, Philippines, Samoa, Sri Lanka, Taiwan, Thailand, and Timor-Leste.

Eurasia
IRI in Eurasia currently works in the following countries: Armenia, Belarus, Georgia, Kazakhstan, Kyrgyz Republic, Moldova, Ukraine, and Uzbekistan.

Controversies

2004 Haitian coup 

The IRI received funding for the Haiti project from USAID for two years (late 2002–2004). IRI ended all programming in Haiti in summer 2007.

Canadian Broadcasting Corporation television premiered a documentary film about the IRI's role in the coup, Haiti: Democracy Undone, on 29 January 2006.

IRI was accused by former US Ambassador Brian Dean Curran of undermining his efforts to hold peaceful negotiations between Aristide and his opposition after contested senatorial elections in 2000. According to Curran, Stanley Lucas, then IRI's representative in Haiti, advised opposition leaders not to compromise with Aristide, who would soon be driven from power. Curran also alleged that Lucas represented himself to the opposition as the true envoy of Washington, and his advice—which was contrary to that of the State Department—as advice from the American government. IRI responded to Ambassador Curran's allegations in a letter to the New York Times.

2009 Honduran constitutional crisis 

The IRI received $550,000 from the National Endowment for Democracy in 2009 in order to "promote and enhance the participation of think tanks in Mexico and Honduras as 'pressure groups' to impel political parties to develop concrete positions on key issues", and to "support initiatives to implement political positions during the campaigns in 2009" following the 2009 Honduran constitutional crisis.

Cuba 
The Cuban government accuses former Congressional staffer Caleb McCarry of orchestrating the 2004 Haitian coup and attempting to provoke a coup d'état in Cuba.

Middle East
According to an April 2011 New York Times article, the IRI, the National Democratic Institute for International Affairs and other groups were credited for training activists in the Middle East, specifically Egypt and Tunisia, who were advocating for reform in authoritarian regimes.

A ministry of justice's report on foreign funding of NGOs in Egypt has revealed that IRI in Egypt has received funding of about 7 million dollars by USAID for the Egyptian 2011–12 elections. The military rulers who gained control of the country following the January 2011 revolution consider this foreign funding interference in internal affairs.

Poland
The IRI program in Poland began in 1991 and has said that it united and organised a diverse range of "center and center right-wing" political parties together to create the Solidarity Electoral Action (AWS), which was in government in Poland, together with its coalition partner the Freedom Union (UW) party, from 1997 to 2001. It also said that it provided training in political campaigning, communications training and research which helped organise and create the AWS.

China
In August 2020, IRI president Daniel Twining was sanctioned – together with the heads of four other U.S.-based democracy and human rights organizations and six U.S. Republican lawmakers – by the Chinese government for supporting the Hong Kong pro-democracy movement in the 2019–20 Hong Kong protests. The leaders of the five organizations saw the sanctioning, whose details were unspecified, as a tit-for-tat measure in response to the earlier sanctioning by the U.S. of 11 Hong Kong officials. The latter step had in turn been a reaction to the enactment of the Hong Kong National Security Law at the end of June.

See also
National Democratic Institute for International Affairs
National Endowment for Democracy

References

Further reading

External links
International Republican Institute official site

 
Organizations established in 1983
Republican Party (United States) organizations
1983 establishments in the United States
National Endowment for Democracy
Undesirable organizations in Russia